Jan Tratnik (born 23 February 1990 in Ljubljana) is a Slovenian cyclist, who currently rides for UCI WorldTeam . He was named in the startlist for the 2017 Giro d'Italia. In July 2019, he was named in the startlist for the 2019 Tour de France.

Major results

2009
 3rd Time trial, National Under-23 Road Championships
 5th Poreč Trophy
 10th Overall Grand Prix du Portugal
2010
 1st Gran Premio della Liberazione
 2nd Overall Giro delle Regioni
 3rd Road race, National Under-23 Road Championships
 4th Overall Istrian Spring Trophy
2012
 1st  Road race, UEC European Under-23 Road Championships
 2nd Time trial, National Under-23 Road Championships
 4th Ronde van Vlaanderen Beloften
 7th Trofeo Banca Popolare di Vicenza
 9th Central European Tour Budapest GP
2014
 3rd Central European Tour Budapest GP
 4th Overall Oberösterreich Rundfahrt
 4th Central European Tour Košice–Miskolc
 5th Banja Luka–Belgrade II
 5th Raiffeisen Grand Prix
 6th Poreč Trophy
 7th Grand Prix Südkärnten
 8th Visegrad 4 Bicycle Race – GP Slovakia
 9th GP Izola
2015
 National Road Championships
1st  Time trial
4th Road race
 1st  Overall East Bohemia Tour
1st Stage 2
 Tour de Hongrie
1st  Points classification
1st Stage 5
 1st  Points classification, Tour of Austria
 4th GP Adria Mobil
 6th Visegrad 4 Bicycle Race – GP Slovakia
 10th Belgrade Banjaluka I
2016
 1st  Road race, National Road Championships
 1st  Overall East Bohemia Tour
1st  Points classification
1st Stage 2
 1st  Points classification, Istrian Spring Trophy
 1st  Mountains classification, Tour of Slovenia
 2nd Poreč Trophy
 3rd Rudi Altig Race
 7th Overall Okolo Slovenska
1st Stage 5
 9th GP Izola
2017
 1st  Overall Okolo Slovenska
1st  Points classification
1st Prologue
 1st Stage 1b (TTT) Settimana Internazionale di Coppi e Bartali
 3rd Overall Czech Cycling Tour
 4th Road race, National Road Championships
 8th Overall Volta ao Alentejo
 10th Time trial, UCI Road World Championships
2018
 National Road Championships
1st  Time trial
4th Road race
 1st Volta Limburg Classic
 1st Stage 4 (ITT) Settimana Internazionale di Coppi e Bartali
 2nd Overall Tour de Luxembourg
 2nd Overall Okolo Slovenska
 3rd Overall CCC Tour - Grody Piastowskie
1st Stage 1 (ITT)
 5th Brabantse Pijl
 9th Eschborn–Frankfurt
2019
 1st Prologue Tour de Romandie
 3rd Time trial, National Road Championships
 8th Chrono des Nations
2020
 1st Stage 16 Giro d'Italia
 6th Time trial, UEC European Road Championships
2021
 National Road Championships
1st  Time trial
4th Road race
2022
 National Road Championships
1st  Time trial
 9th Milan–San Remo
 9th Dwars door Vlaanderen
2023
 1st Stage 3 (TTT) Paris–Nice

Grand Tour general classification results timeline

References

External links

 
 
 
 
 
 
 

1990 births
Living people
Slovenian male cyclists
Slovenian Giro d'Italia stage winners
European Games competitors for Slovenia
Cyclists at the 2015 European Games
People from Idrija
Olympic cyclists of Slovenia
Cyclists at the 2020 Summer Olympics